The U.S. National Badminton Championships is a tournament organized by USA Badminton (originally the American Badminton Association) and held annually to crown the best badminton players in the United States.

The tournament started in Chicago in 1937. Currently, all participants must be U.S. citizens or have resided in the United States in the preceding 12 months. There is also a separate U.S. Open Badminton Championships which is open to foreign competitors. The history of the two tournaments is rather complicated. Prior to 1954 all U.S. Badminton Championships had a "closed" format with only U.S. citizens and residents eligible to compete. From 1954 through 1969 the tournament was open to foreign competition. Between 1970 and 1976 the format fluctuated. Both a closed and an open tournament were held from 1970 through 1972; an open tournament was held in 1973; a closed tournament was held in 1974 and 1975; and both a closed and an open tournament were held again in 1976. From 1977 through 1982 all U.S. national championships were closed. Since 1983 both a closed and an open tournament have generally been held at separate times in the season (the previous closed/open tourneys had been held contiguously). The following table lists only the winners of the closed U.S. National Badminton Championships.

Past winners

References

External links
Brief History of Badminton - Badminton in the US
2006 U.S National - Past Champions

Badminton tournaments in the United States
United States
Recurring sporting events established in 1937
Badminton